Stephen J. Cloobeck (born October 26, 1961) is an American businessman and substantial political donor. He is the founder and former chairman and chief executive officer of the timeshare company Diamond Resorts.

Early life
In 1983, Cloobeck graduated from Brandeis University with a degree in Psychobiology.

Business activity
In April 2007, Cloobeck acquired the publicly traded company Sunterra Corporation and converted it into Diamond Resorts International. He is also the chairman of the board of the US Corporation for Travel Promotion. Cloobeck stepped down as chairman and chief executive officer of Diamond Resorts International when the company was purchased by Apollo Global Management, LLC in June 2016.

Charitable and political activity
Cloobeck was chairman of the board of the Nevada Cancer Institute. In 2012, he endowed the "Stephen J. Cloobeck '83 Endowed Fellowship" at the Brandeis University International Business School. He was a founder of the Brent Shapiro Foundation for Drug Awareness. He has also worked with a number of other charitable and educational groups.

In 2007, Cloobeck publicly considered running for governor of Nevada, but instead purchased Sunterra.

In June 2011, donated $100,000 to Majority PAC, a PAC oriented to promoting Democratic candidates to the U.S. Senate. The donation was sent as a check from "JHJM Nevada I, LLC," which made the source not readily evident.

On June 3, 2016, Cloobeck donated $1,000,000 to Priorities USA Action, a pro-Hillary Clinton PAC.

In January 2017, he explored a plan to run for governor in the state of Nevada, intending to seed his campaign with $5 million of his own money. He told the Las Vegas Review-Journal he was conducting polling exploring a bid. In April 2017, Cloobeck endorsed incumbent U.S. Senator Dean Heller (R) for re-election.

On October 2, 2017, it was reported that Cloobeck donated $400,000 to the Las Vegas shooting GoFundMe campaign setup by law enforcement for benefit of victims.

Cloobeck is the largest donor to The Nevada Independent, having donated $1,000,000.

In December 2022, Cloobeck announced he had handed in his resignation to the Nevada athletic commission. He stated his reason for leaving the commission was due to not being able to work Gov.-elect Joe Lombardo.

Media
Cloobeck has appeared on the US edition of Undercover Boss twice.  Cloobeck first appeared in Season 3, Episode 1 (initially aired January 15, 2012), and again in Season 4, Episode 4 (initially aired November 30, 2012).

On November 7, 2017, Cloobeck appeared on MSNBC and said he told Democratic leaders he would "cut your money off" if they criticize the wealthy, saying: "I've talked to [Senator Chuck] Schumer, I've talked to [Senator Ron] Wyden, I've talked to [Representative Nancy] Pelosi and I've said if you use the term billionaire again, I'm done."

Personal life 
In July 2020, Cloobeck began dating Canadian-based OnlyFans model Stefanie Gurzanski without knowing her past as a pornographic performer  and someone who poses nude for money . They dated for five months. Their relationship ended after Cloobeck discovered that she was secretly taking nude photos in his houses and selling them on OnlyFans. Cloobeck sued Gurzanski on January 7 in state court, in Los Angeles, for a variety of offenses, including fraud and trespassing. On January 12, Gurzanski asked the California state court for a temporary restraining order against Cloobeck. In an affidavit she filed, she stated that, “He started telling me that I was no longer allowed to publish pictures on Onlyfans.com...I told him that I was going to keep doing my work as it is a source of income.” On March 8,  Cloobeck filed an amended complaint against Gurzanski, alleging that she deceived him by claiming to be a “legitimate fashion model”, and that Gurzanski secretly used his private jets and mansions as backdrops for her nude OnlyFans shoots—including while his teenage daughter was in the house. “Little did I know that while I was working in my various homes and my children were in the home and my employees, she was shooting porn in the bathrooms and putting it on OnlyFans,” Cloobeck said.

Cloobeck claims he's the “sole and exclusive” owner of the photos showing Gurzanski in skimpy bikinis and a revealing pink dress, which he says she published without his permission. Cloobeck is also seeking to be reimbursed for the more than $1.3 million worth of gifts and “experiences” he lavished on his ex — including more than 100 bikinis and pieces of lingerie that she “used as props in her ... OnlyFans posts,” the suit claims.

Cloobeck says he has offered to settle with Gurzanski if she returns the gifts he bought her so he can donate the proceeds to charity, take down any photos that show his property, and provide a public apology acknowledging she deceived him about her pornographic history. She claims she has offered to give back all of the gifts he bought her and the things she bought for herself with his credit card, but a Cloobeck spokesperson said Cloobeck has been the one offering to settle.

On April 1, Arthur Barens, Gurzanski’s lawyer, filed a motion with the court seeking sanctions against Cloobeck, in excess of $100,000, for violating the temporary restraining order. Cloobeck’s lawyer Robert Allen said Cloobeck was only communicating with Gurzanski to urge her to agree to a settlement of his lawsuit. Cloobeck’s legal team has moved for the restraining order to be quashed, claiming the court didn't have jurisdiction over him at the time because he was in Mexico.

References 

1961 births
Living people
American business executives
Brandeis University alumni
American philanthropists
American real estate businesspeople
Nevada Democrats
Businesspeople from Nevada
American hoteliers
20th-century American businesspeople
21st-century American businesspeople
Participants in American reality television series